Spaghetti bowl may refer to:
 Spaghetti, a pasta dish sometimes served in a bowl.
 Spaghetti Bowl (transportation), a network of highway interconnects (interchange ramps) that look like spaghetti in a bowl when viewed from overhead.
 Spaghetti Bowl (Las Vegas), a freeway interchange near downtown Las Vegas, Nevada.
 Spaghetti bowl effect, an economic phenomenon.
 Spaghetti Bowl (American football), a 1945 American football game in Italy